Okene is a town in the Nigerian state of Kogi. The town is based in a Local Government Area of the same name. Okene runs along the A2 highway. It had an area of 328 km² and a population of 320,260 at the 2006 census.

The predominant people are the Ebira of central Nigeria; the local languages is Ebira.

The postal code of the area is 264.

People 

Okene is the birthplace of American Hockey League player and National Hockey League prospect Akim Aliu.
Another prominent Nigerian that hails from Okene is Engineer Joseph Makoju, the former managing director of the Power Holding Company of Nigeria and currently the Honorary Adviser to Mr President on Electric Power and the Honorary Adviser to the President/CEO Dangote Group on Strategies. Okene is also the birthplace of Governor Yahaya Bello.

Education 
The Federal College of Education is situated in Okene along Okene-Lokoja road. There is also a satellite campus of the Kogi State Polythecnic. There are also different schools in Okene including high schools like Abdulaziz Atta Memorial College Okene (AAMCO), Local Government Secondary School Ohiana (LGSS), College of Arabic and Islamic Studies Okene (CAISO), Solardad Group of Schools located close G.R.A Okene, Samaritan Nursery And Primary School located at Ozuwaya beside Kekere Guest Palace Okene and many other notable schools.Jn

History
Okene Local Government Area was created in 1976 from the then Ebira Division by the Administration of General Olusegun Obasanjo, following the 1976 Local Government Reform. Ajaokuta and Ogori-Magongo LGAs were created from the old Okene LGA in 1991 and 1996 respectively. The people of Okene Local Government Area are a part of Ebira Tao people of the Central Senatorial District of Kogi State.

They are believed to have migrated from Jukun in the present day Taraba State and had a brief stopover in Idah before moving to its present location. The present Okene LGA is composed of Okene and Okengwe districts. There are 11 wards in the Local Government which are Bariki, Otutu, Orietesu, Lafia/Obessa, Okene-Eba, Idoji, Onyukoko, Obehira-Eba, Obehira-Uvete, Abuga/Ozuja and Upogoro/Odenku wards. The people are predominantly Muslims with a large size of Christian population too. To a great extent, there is a fusion of tradition and religions with only a negligible few still practicing exclusively traditional religion.

Okene is known as one of the most beautiful places in the whole of West Africa with attractions like the Azad Palace, which belongs to the Ohinoyi (King) of Ebiraland, Dr. Ado Ibrahim Atta.

climate

References 

Okene Page on Ebira Online Media
Hotel.ng/places

Local Government Areas in Kogi State
Cities in Yorubaland
Cities in Nigeria